Paul Hackett may refer to:

 Paul Hackett (politician) (born 1963), American lawyer and former Congressional candidate
 Paul Hackett (American football) (born 1947), American football coach
 Paul Hackett, director of the Smith Institute